Erdenebilegiin Bolormaa (born on ), better known by her ring name  is a Mongolian female professional wrestler and mixed martial artist. She is considered as Mongolia's first female professional wrestler and also the first female mixed martial artist from Mongolia.

Background

Professional wrestling career

Mixed martial arts career
A few months after her pro-wrestling retirement, Erdenebileg joined the Smash pro-wrestling promotion and started training at the Smash Alley Gym - the MMA division of Smash - with the purpose of debuting in MMA.

In her MMA debut, Erdenebileg was submitted by Aoki with an armbar in the first round.

Sugiyama's corner threw in the towel shortly after the beginning of the second round when Erdenebileg once again hurt Sugiyama with punches, giving Erdenebileg her first professional win.

She was defeated by armbar submission in the second round.

Outside sports

Mixed martial arts record

|-
| Loss
|align=center| 2–2
|  Hiroko Yamanaka
| Submission (armbar)
| Jewels 15th Ring
| 
|align=center| 2
|align=center| 2:20
| Tokyo, Japan
| 
|-
| Win
|align=center| 2–1
|  Chisa Yonezawa
| TKO (doctor stoppage)
| Jewels 13th Ring & 14th Ring
| 
|align=center| 1
|align=center| 5:00
| Tokyo, Japan
|
|-
| Win
|align=center| 1–1
|  Shizuka Sugiyama
| TKO (corner stoppage)
| Jewels 11th Ring
| 
|align=center| 2
|align=center| 0:13
| Tokyo, Japan
|
|-
| Loss
|align=center| 0–1
|  Mayumi Aoki
| Technical submission (armbar)
| Jewels 9th Ring
| 
|align=center| 1
|align=center| 4:34
| Tokyo, Japan
|

See also
List of female mixed martial artists

References

External links
 Bolormaa Erdenebilegiin Awakening Profile

Profile at Fightergirls.com

Mongolian female professional wrestlers
Mongolian female mixed martial artists
Mixed martial artists utilizing wrestling
1985 births
Living people
People from Ulaanbaatar
21st-century Mongolian women singers